Dul Kabud may refer to:
 Dul Kabud, Ilam
 Dul Kabud, Lorestan